Waleran I may refer to:

 Waleran I of Limburg (died 1082)
 Waleran I of Luxembourg, Lord of Ligny (died 1288)